How Wood railway station is in the village of How Wood, Hertfordshire, England. It is the fourth station on the Abbey Line,  from Watford Junction. Like all the other stations on the branch (except Watford Junction), it is a simple unstaffed halt. It was opened by British Rail in October 1988 to coincide with the overhead electrification of the line.

Services
All services at How Wood are operated by London Northwestern Railway. This is increased to a train approximately every 45 minutes in each direction during the peak hours. Services are typically operated using  EMUs.

Future
In November 2007 responsibility for the branch line, including How Wood, passed from Silverlink trains to Govia London Midland trains. Installation of Oyster Card readers on the stations along the branch is a possibility, although there are other ticketing options too.

Restoration of the crossing loop at Bricket Wood is being considered by the local authorities and Network Rail, which would facilitate trains running every 30 minutes.

References

External links

How Wood Station at abbeyline.org.uk

Railway stations in Hertfordshire
Railway stations opened by British Rail
Railway stations in Great Britain opened in 1988
Railway stations served by West Midlands Trains